The Daniel Motley Williams House in Green County, Kentucky near Summersville, Kentucky was built c.1800.  It was listed on the National Register of Historic Places in  1984.

The main house included Federal architecture.  The listing included a total of four contributing buildings.

The house was deemed significant as the "only example in the county of the combination of single-pen & saddlebag log house forms."

References

National Register of Historic Places in Green County, Kentucky
Federal architecture in Kentucky
Houses completed in 1800
Houses on the National Register of Historic Places in Kentucky
1800 establishments in Kentucky
Single pen architecture
Double pen architecture
Log buildings and structures on the National Register of Historic Places in Kentucky